Luis Felix Blanco Lugo (November 20, 1921 – October 28, 1973) was a judge who served as an Associate Justice on the Supreme Court of Puerto Rico from 1961 until 1970.

Life 
Born in Fajardo, Puerto Rico, Lugo studied law at the University of Puerto Rico School of Law from 1939 to 1942.

After obtaining his law degree, Lugo was a legal official for Chief Justice of the Puerto Rico Supreme Court Emilio del Toro Cuebas and Associate Justice A. Cecil Snyder.

In 1961 was appointed Associate Justices of the Supreme Court of Puerto Rico by Governor Luis Muñoz Marín.

Died on October 28, 1973 in San Juan, Puerto Rico at age 51.

Sources 

La Justicia en sus Manos by Luis Rafael Rivera, 

1921 births
1973 deaths
Associate Justices of the Supreme Court of Puerto Rico
People from Fajardo, Puerto Rico
20th-century Puerto Rican lawyers
University of Puerto Rico alumni
20th-century American judges